Felix Bressart (March 2, 1892  – March 17, 1949) was a German-American actor of stage and screen.

Life and career
Bressart (pronounced "BRESS-ert") was born in East Prussia, Germany (now part of Russia). His acting debut came in 1914 as Malvolio in "Twelfth Night," and he went on to act in Austria, Denmark, England, France, Germany, Hungary, and Yugoslavia. He was an experienced stage actor when he had his film debut in 1927. He began as a supporting actor, for example as the bailiff in the boxoffice hit Die Drei von der Tankstelle (The Three from the Filling Station), but soon established himself in leading roles of minor movies. After the Nazis seized power in 1933, the Jewish Bressart left Germany and continued his career in German-speaking movies in Austria, where Jewish artists were still relatively safe. After acting in 40 German films, he emigrated to the United States in 1936.

One of Bressart's former European colleagues was Joe Pasternak, who had become a Hollywood producer. Bressart's first American film was Three Smart Girls Grow Up (1939), a vehicle for the Universal Pictures' star, Deanna Durbin. Pasternak chose Bressart to perform in a screen test opposite Pasternak's newest discovery, Gloria Jean. The German community in Hollywood helped to establish Bressart in America, as his earliest American movies were directed by Ernst Lubitsch, Henry Koster, and Wilhelm Thiele  (who had directed Bressart in The Three from the Filling Station). 

Bressart appeared in Lubitsch's Ninotchka (1939), as one of the Soviet emissaries followed by Greta Garbo to Paris. A Metro-Goldwyn-Mayer picture, the studio signed Bressart as a contract player. Most of his MGM work consisted of featured supporting roles in major films including Edison, the Man, Comrade X,  and  Lubitsch's The Shop Around the Corner, all released in 1940. 

In Lubitsch's To Be or Not to Be (1942), he recites Shylock's famous "Hath not a Jew eyes?" speech from The Merchant of Venice. 

Other films Bressart appeared in include Blossoms in the Dust (1941), Three Hearts for Julia (1943), The Seventh Cross (1944), and Without Love (1945). 

Bressart left MGM in 1945 to work for other studios. His first freelance job featured his largest role; he co-starred in the RKO "B" musical comedy Ding Dong Williams, filmed in April 1945. Bressart, billed third, played the bemused supervisor of a movie studio's music department, and appeared in formal wear to conduct an orchestral version of Chopin's Fantaisie-Impromptu. Bressart received special mention for his performance in this low-budget feature.

After almost 40 Hollywood pictures, Felix Bressart suddenly died of leukemia at the age of 57. His last film was to be My Friend Irma (1949), the movie version of a popular radio show. Bressart died during production, forcing the studio to reshoot his completed scenes with Hans Conried, who was playing the same role, "Professor Kropotkin," on radio. In the finished film, Felix Bressart is still seen in the long shots.

Complete filmography

German language films

Liebe im Kuhstall (Love in the Cowshed) (1928) - Der Gerichtsvollzieher
Es gibt eine Frau, die dich niemals vergißt (1930)
Der Sohn der weißen Berge (The Son of the White Mountain) (1930) - Jailer
 (1930, Short) - Der Untermieter
Die zärtlichen Verwandten (The Tender Relatives) (1930) - Onkel Emil
Die Drei von der Tankstelle (1930) - Gerichtsvollzieher / Bailiff
Der keusche Josef (Josef the Chaste) (1930) - Eizes, ihr Faktotum
Das alte Lied (The Old Song) (1930) - Jacques
Drei Tage Mittelarrest (Three Days Confined to Barracks) (1930) - Franz Nowotni, Fuesilier
Eine Freundin so goldig wie Du (1930) - Richard
Die Privatsekretärin (The Private Secretary) (1931) - Bankdiener Hasel
Der wahre Jakob (The True Jacob) (1931) - Böcklein
Der Schrecken der Garnison (Terror of the Garrison) (1931) - Musketier Kulicke
Nie wieder Liebe! (No More Love) (1931) - Jean
 (1931) - Major Fröschen
Ausflug ins Leben (1931) - Hirsekorn - Schauspieler und Chauffeur
Kameradschaft (Comradeship) (1931) - Café Doorman (uncredited)
Der Herr Bürovorsteher (The Office Manager) (1931) - Joachim Reißnagel
Holzapfel weiß alles (Holzapfel Knows Everything) (1932) - Johannes Georg Holzapfel
Der Glückszylinder (The Magic Top Hat) (1932) - Gottfried Jonathan Bankbeamter
...und wer küßt mich? (And Who Is Kissing Me?) (1933) - Direktor Ritter
Wie d'Warret würkt (1933) - Herr Schramek
C'était un musicien (1933) - Le baron Vandernyff
Salto in die Seligkeit (Leap into Bliss) (1933) - Kriegel, Geheimdetektiv
Peter (1934) - Her grandfather
 Ball at the Savoy (1935) - Birowitsch, der Sekretär
Alles für die Firma (Everything for the Company) (1935) - Philipp Sonndorfer
Viereinhalb Musketiere (1935) - Professor Volksmann
Heut' ist der schönste Tag in meinem Leben (1935) - Max Kaspar

English language films

Three Smart Girls Grow Up (1939) - Music Teacher
Bridal Suite (1939) - Maxl
Ninotchka (1939) - Comrade Buljanoff
Swanee River (1939) - Henry Kleber
The Shop Around the Corner (1940) - Pirovitch
It All Came True (1940) - The Great Boldini
Edison, the Man (1940) - Michael Simon
Third Finger, Left Hand (1940) - August Winkel
Escape (1940) - Fritz Keller
Bitter Sweet (1940) - Max
Comrade X (1940) - Vanya 
Ziegfeld Girl (1941) - Mischa
Blossoms in the Dust (1941) - Dr. Max Breslar
Married Bachelor (1941) - Professor Ladislaus Milic
Kathleen (1941) - Mr. Schoner
Mr. and Mrs. North (1942) - Arthur Talbot
To Be or Not to Be (1942) - Greenberg
Crossroads (1942) - Dr. Andre Tessier
Iceland (1942) - Papa Jonsdottir
Three Hearts for Julia (1943) - Anton Ottoway
Above Suspicion (1943) - Mr. A. Werner
Don't Be a Sucker (1943, Short) - Anti-Nazi Teacher (uncredited)
Song of Russia (1944) - Petrov
The Seventh Cross (1944) - Poldi Schlamm
Greenwich Village (1944) - Hofer
Blonde Fever (1944) - Johnny
Secrets in the Dark (1944, Short)
Without Love (1945) - Prof. Ginza
Dangerous Partners (1945) - Prof. Roland Budlow
Ding Dong Williams (1946) - Hugo Meyerhold
The Thrill of Brazil (1946) - Ludwig Kriegspiel
Her Sister's Secret (1946) - Pepe - New Orleans Cafe Owner
I've Always Loved You (1946) - Frederick Hassman
A Song Is Born (1948) - Professor Gerkikoff
Portrait of Jennie (1948) - Pete
Take One False Step (1949) - Professor Morris Avrum (final film role)

References

External links

Photographs and literature

1892 births
1949 deaths
People from East Prussia
Jewish emigrants from Nazi Germany to the United States
Deaths from leukemia
Deaths from cancer in California
Burials at Hollywood Forever Cemetery
German male stage actors
German male film actors
20th-century German male actors